The 2003 WTA Tour Championships, also known by its sponsored name  Bank of America WTA Tour Championships Presented by Porsche, was a women's tennis tournament played on indoor hard courts at the Staples Center in Los Angeles, United States. It was the 33rd edition of the year-end singles championships, the 28th edition of the year-end doubles championships, and was part of the 2003 WTA Tour. The tournament was held between November 4 and November 10, 2003. First-seeded Kim Clijsters won the singles event and earned $1,000,030 first-prize money as well as 485 ranking points. With her victory Clijsters became the first female tennis player to earn $US4 million in a season. For the first time since 1978 a round robin system was used, after the men's Tennis Masters Cup. Two groups of four players were formed and each contender had to play three matches. Also, for singles, instead of the top sixteen players qualifying, only top eight qualified for the WTA Tour Championships. For doubles, the top four pairs (previously top eight) pairs qualified for the WTA Tour Championships, but still continued with the single elimination format.

Finals

Singles

 Kim Clijsters defeated  Amélie Mauresmo, 6–2, 6–0.
It was Clijsters's 2nd WTA Championships title, her 9th title of the season and the 19th of her career.

Doubles

 Virginia Ruano Pascual /  Paola Suárez defeated  Kim Clijsters /  Ai Sugiyama, 6–4, 3–6, 6–3.

Notes

References

External links
 
 WTA Championships draws (PDF)

WTA Tour Championships
WTA Tour Championships
WTA Tour Championships
WTA Tour Championships
WTA Tour Championships
WTA Tour Championships
Sports competitions in Los Angeles
Tennis in Los Angeles
Tennis tournaments in California